John Hodgson was a member of the Wisconsin State Senate.

Biography
Hodgson was born in Yorkshire, England in 1812. In 1840, he married Cassandra M. Blake in Pontiac, Michigan. They would have six children, including Manville S. Hodgson, before her death on January 5, 1860. In December of that year, Hodgson married Esther Enos. He had settled in what is now Waukesha County, Wisconsin in 1842. Hodgson died there on December 22, 1869.

Senate career
Hodgson was elected to the Senate in 1861. He was a Republican.

References

People from Yorkshire
English emigrants to the United States
People from Waukesha County, Wisconsin
Republican Party Wisconsin state senators
1812 births
1869 deaths
19th-century American politicians